Andrew Douglas (born 12 August 1998 in New York) is an American professional squash player. As of March 2021, he was ranked number 111 in the world. He won the 2018 Barbados Open professional tournament
Douglas won a bronze medal and gold medal for the United States at the 2019 Pan American Games in Lima Peru. https://en.m.wikipedia.org/wiki/Squash_at_the_2019_Pan_American_Games

Douglas currently studies at the University of Pennsylvania and is expected to graduate in the class of 2021. He plays number 1 on the men's varsity squash team for Penn.

References

1998 births
Living people
American male squash players
Penn Quakers men's squash players
Pan American Games medalists in squash
Pan American Games gold medalists for the United States
Pan American Games bronze medalists for the United States
Squash players at the 2019 Pan American Games
Medalists at the 2019 Pan American Games
21st-century American people